Wrestling is a sport of physical engagement between two individuals, in which each wrestler strives to obtain a position of advantage over their opponent, within a given ruleset. Wrestling involves different grappling-type techniques such as clinch fighting, throws and takedowns, joint locks, pins, and other grappling holds. Many different wrestling techniques have been incorporated into martial arts, combat sports, and military systems. The sport can either be genuinely competitive or sportive entertainment (see professional wrestling).

Wrestling comes in different forms such as freestyle, Greco-Roman, judo, sambo, folkstyle, catch, submission, sumo, pehlwani, shuai jiao, and others. Wrestling first appeared in the ancient Olympic Games as an event during the 18th Olympiad in 708 BC.

There are a wide range of styles with varying rules, with both traditional historic and modern styles. The term wrestling is attested in late Old English, as wræstlunge (glossing palestram).

History 

Wrestling represents one of the oldest forms of combat sport. The origins of wrestling go back around 15,000 years through cave drawings in France. Babylonian and Egyptian reliefs show wrestlers using various holds known in the present-day sport. Literary references to wrestling occur as early as the Old Testament and the ancient Indian Vedas. In the Book of Genesis, the Patriarch Jacob is said to have wrestled with God or an angel. The Iliad, in which Homer recounts the Trojan War of the 13th or 12th century BC, also contains mentions of wrestling. Indian epics Ramayana and Mahabharata contain references to martial arts including wrestling.

In Ancient Greece wrestling occupied a prominent place in legend, literature, and philosophy. Wrestling competition, brutal in many aspects, served as the focal sport of the ancient Olympic Games. Ancient Romans borrowed heavily from Greek wrestling, but eliminated much of its brutality through implementing different rules. Wrestling is referenced throughout both Ancient Greek and Roman literature. Many philosophers and leaders practiced wrestling and/or referenced the sport frequently in their works, most notably Plato, Socrates, Aristotle, Xenophon, Epictetus, Seneca, Plutarch, and Marcus Aurelius. Dicaearchus wrote that Plato wrestled at the Isthmian games. Many of Plato's dialogues are set in wrestling schools. Ancient Greek lyric poet Pindar wrote victory odes, grouped into four books named after the Olympian, Pythian, Isthmian, and Nemean GamesPanhellenic festivals held respectively at Olympia, Delphi, Corinth, and Nemea. These odes were composed to honor the men and youths who had enjoyed victories in wrestling, boxing, pankration and other athletic contests.

During the Middle Ages (fifth century to fifteenth century) wrestling remained popular and enjoyed the patronage of many royal families, including those of France, Japan, and England.

Early British settlers in America brought a strong wrestling tradition with them. The settlers also found wrestling to be popular among Native Americans. Amateur wrestling flourished throughout the early years of the North American colonies and would later serve as a popular activity at country fairs, holiday celebrations, and in military exercises. The first organized national wrestling tournament in the United States took place in New York City in 1888. Wrestling has also been an event at every modern Olympic Games since the 1904 games in St. Louis, Missouri (Greco-Roman wrestling was contested at the at the first modern Olympics in 1896, but not at the 1900 games). The international governing body for the sport, United World Wrestling (UWW), was established in 1912 in Antwerp, Belgium as the International Federation of Associated Wrestling Styles (FILA). The first annual NCAA Wrestling Championships were held in 1928 in Ames, Iowa. USA Wrestling, located in Colorado Springs, Colorado, became the national governing body of U.S. amateur wrestling in 1983.

By country 
 In Ancient Egypt, wrestling has been evidenced by documentation on tombs (circa 2300 BC) and Egyptian artwork (circa 2000–1085 BC).
 In Ancient Greece, Greek wrestling was a popular form of martial art (circa 1100 to 146 BC).
 Oil wrestling is the national sport of Turkey and can be traced back to Central Asia.
 After the Roman conquest of the Greeks, Greek wrestling was absorbed by the Roman culture and became Roman wrestling during the period of the Roman Empire (510 BC to AD 500).
 Shuai jiao, a wrestling style originating in China, which according to legend, has a reported history of over 4,000 years.
 Arabic literature depicted Muhammad as a skilled wrestler, defeating a skeptic in a match at one point.
 The Byzantine emperor Basil I, according to court historians, won in wrestling against a boastful wrestler from Bulgaria in the eighth century.
 In 1520 at the Field of the Cloth of Gold pageant, Francis I of France threw fellow king Henry VIII of England in a wrestling match.
 The Lancashire style of folk wrestling may have formed the basis for Catch wrestling, also known as "catch as catch can." The Scots later formed a variant of this style, and the Irish developed the "collar-and-elbow" style which later found its way into the United States. This various styles would form what would become folkstyle wrestling, which is the most popular form of wrestling in the United States.
 A Frenchman "is generally credited with reorganizing European loose wrestling into a professional sport", Greco-Roman wrestling. This style which was finalized by the 19th century and by then, wrestling was featured in many fairs and festivals in Europe. Greco-Roman wrestling and contemporary freestyle wrestling were soon regulated in formal competitions, in part resulting from the rise of gymnasiums and athletic clubs.
 Starting in continental Europe, prize money was offered in large sums to the winners of Greco-Roman tournaments, with the style of freestyle wrestling spreading rapidly in the United Kingdom and in the United States during the late 1800s. Wrestling professionals soon increased the popularity of Greco-Roman and freestyle wrestling, worldwide. Greco-Roman wrestling was contested at the first modern Olympics in 1896. Freestyle wrestling became an Olympic event in 1904 and women's freestyle wrestling was added to the Olympics in 2004.
 Celtic wrestling has an extensive history, with wrestling being mentioned in the Tailteann Games dating back from somewhere between 1839 BC to 632 BC (academics disagree) to the 12th century AD when the Normans invaded. Various styles such as Cornish wrestling, Gouren, Collar-and-elbow wrestling, etc. are likely to have evolved from some common style.
 Since 1921, United World Wrestling (UWW) has regulated amateur wrestling as an athletic discipline, while professional wrestling, originally a legitimate sport, gradually became infused with theatrics but still requires athletic ability. Today, various countries around the world send national wrestling teams to the Olympics.
 In Switzerland the local derivate of the German ringen, called schwingen, is a popular folk sport with local Schwingfest where regional competitions are played throughout the country.

Mythology 

Some of the earliest references to wrestling can be found in wrestling mythology.
 The Epic of Gilgamesh: Gilgamesh established his credibility as a leader, after wrestling Enkidu.
 Greek mythology celebrates the rise of Zeus as ruler of the earth after a wrestling match with his father, Cronus. Both Heracles and Theseus were famous for their wrestling against man and beast.
 The Mahabharata describes a malla-dwandwa (wrestling match) between the accomplished wrestlers Bhima and Jarasandha.
 Rustam of the Shahnameh (Book Of Kings) is regarded by Iranian pahlevans as the greatest wrestler.

Gallery

Modern international disciplines 
Wrestling disciplines, as defined by UWW, are broken down into two categories: International wrestling disciplines and folk wrestling disciplines. UWW currently recognizes six wrestling disciplines in all. Three are Olympic disciplines: Greco-Roman wrestling, men's freestyle wrestling and female wrestling (i.e. women's freestyle wrestling). The other three are amateur pankration, belt wrestling alysh and beach wrestling.

Greco-Roman

Greco-Roman is an international discipline and one of two wrestling disciplines featured in the Olympic Games. This form of wrestling prioritizes upper body attacks, with an emphasis on explosive "high amplitude" throws. Under the Greco-Roman ruleset, it is forbidden to attack the opponent below the belt in the execution of any action (restricting holds, trips, and active but not passive usage of the legs). Points are allotted on the basis of throw amplitude, exposure of an opponent's back to the mat and opponent passivity. A Greco-Roman wrestler may instantly win a match by holding both of an opponent's scapula to the mat (known as a "fall"). A well known Greco-Roman wrestler is Alexander Karelin from Russia.

Freestyle wrestling

Freestyle wrestling is an international discipline and one of two wrestling disciplines featured in the Olympic Games, for both men and women. This style allows the use of the wrestler's or his opponent's legs in offense and defense. Freestyle wrestling has its origins in catch-as-catch-can wrestling and awards points on the basis of throw amplitude, exposure of an opponent's back to the mat and opponent passivity. A Freestyle wrestler may instantly win a match by holding both of an opponent's scapula to the mat (known as a "fall"). This form of wrestling has some similarities with American scholastic and collegiate wrestling with Freestyle wrestling having a greater emphasis on throw amplitude. Female athletes participate at the American college/university level under the Olympic Freestyle ruleset in contrast to their male counterparts who wrestle under the American folkstyle/collegiate wrestling ruleset.

Amateur pankration

Pankration, from the Greek words pan and kratos and meaning "all of power", is a world heritage martial art which was introduced to the Ancient Olympic Games in 648 BC. Modern amateur pankration is a form of mixed martial arts (MMA) that incorporates techniques from multiple systems. Matches are fought with both grappling holds and by striking techniques.

Belt wrestling alysh

Alysh is a Turkic term for a Central Asian folk wrestling style which involves the wearing of jackets, trousers and thick belts. Throughout the contest the wrestlers must retain their hold on each other's belt. For this reason it is also referred to as 'belt wrestling alysh' or 'alysh belt wrestling'.

Beach wrestling

UWW, then known as FILA, codified the form of beach wrestling in 2004. The style originally mirrored the rules used before the use of wrestling mats, and beach wrestling has been regarded as the oldest version of international competitive wrestling. The wrestlers wear swimsuits rather than special wrestling uniforms. Wrestlers may also wear spandex or athletic shorts.

The international rules have been modified in 2015 by UWW, with the current rules allowing wrestlers to score points via takedowns, pushing their opponent out of bounds, or bringing the opponent down to their back. In addition to the annual World Beach Wrestling Championships, beach wrestling has been contested at Youth Olympic Games, Asian Games, Down Under Games, Mediterranean Games and at the 2019 World Beach Games.

Folk styles

Folk wrestling describes a traditional form of wrestling unique to a culture or geographic region of the world that FILA does not administer rules for. Examples of the many styles of folk wrestling, include Cornish wrestling, backhold wrestling (from Europe), Cumberland Wrestling and Catch-as-catch-can (from England), kurash from Uzbekistan, gushteengiri from Tajikistan, khuresh from Siberia, Lotta Campidanese from Italy, koshti pahlavani from Iran, naban from Myanmar, pehlwani from India, penjang gulat from Indonesia, schwingen from Switzerland, tigel from Ethiopia, kene of the Nagas from India, shuai jiao from China, and ssireum from Korea.

Folk wrestling styles are not recognized as international styles of wrestling by UWW.

Celtic Wrestling styles (eg Cornish wrestling, Scottish Backhold, Cumberland Wrestling, Gouren and Collar-and-elbow) are a subset of Folk Wrestling and have their own regulatory bodies and some are affiliated to other organisations. Eg The Cornish Wrestling Association is affiliated to the British Wrestling Association which is linked to the UWW. The International Federation of Celtic Wrestling (FILC) organises international competitions between wrestlers from these styles.

However, folk styles have been international in nature. For example, there have been regular Cornish wrestling tournaments and matches in the US, Australia, South Africa, New Zealand, England and Cornwall, with irregular tournaments and matches in Japan, Canada and Mexico. There have also been Inter-Celtic tournaments between Cornwall and Brittany dating back to the Field of the Cloth of Gold in 1520 through to the modern era with regular events since 1928.

Oil wrestling
Oil wrestling, also called grease wrestling, is the Turkish national sport. It is so called because the wrestlers douse themselves with olive oil. It is related to Uzbek , Tuvan khuresh and Tatar and Bashkir .

Thus, the  aims to control his opponent by putting his arm through the latter's . To win by this move is called . If no winner is determined, another 15 minutes—10 minutes for the  category—of wrestling ensues, wherein scores are kept to determine the victor.

The annual Kırkpınar tournament, held in Edirne in Turkish Thrace since 1362, is the oldest continuously running, sanctioned sporting competition in the world. In recent years this style of wrestling has also become popular in other countries.

American Collegiate wrestling

Collegiate wrestling (also known as folkstyle wrestling) is the commonly used name of wrestling practiced at the college and university level in the United States. This style, with modifications, is also practiced at the high school and middle school levels, and also for younger participants. The term is used to distinguish the style from other styles of wrestling used in other parts of the world, and from those of the Olympic Games: Greco-Roman wrestling, and Freestyle wrestling.
Some high schools in the U.S. have developed junior varsity and freshman teams alongside varsity teams. Junior varsity and freshman wrestling teams restrict competitors not only by weight, but also by age and the amount of wrestling a competitor can partake in. For example, some junior varsity and freshman competitors are not allowed in tournament competition due to the amount of mat time a wrestler would accrue in a short time period.

Women's college wrestling in the U.S. does not use the collegiate ruleset, instead being conducted under standard freestyle wrestling rules.

There are currently several organizations which oversee collegiate wrestling competition: Divisions I, II, and III of the NCAA, the NAIA, the NJCAA, and the NCWA. NCAA Division I wrestling is considered the most prestigious and challenging level of competition. A school chooses which athletic organization to join, although it may compete against teams from other levels and organizations during regular-season competition. The collegiate season starts in October or November and culminates with the National Championship tournament held in March.

Professional wrestling

Professional wrestling is often concluded in a raised ring; akin to boxing. Although advertised as contests, bouts are actually exhibitions with winners generally pre-determined to increase entertainment value.  Legitimate wrestling skill remained a valuable bargaining chip in the wrestling industry until the late 20th century however, with occasional shoot matches (often to settle some backstage personal or business dispute) taking place in the early days of the business and still occurring well into the 1930s and 1940s and the threat to use legitimate skill to have one's way in the ring still potent decades later.

The roots of professional wrestling lay in the catch-as-catch-can contests of the late 19th century. Whereas the Europeans favored the more controlled and classical Greco-Roman style, the Americans from the 1880s preferred the more wide-open style of wrestling that later became known as freestyle. When the best American catch wrestlers discovered they could earn money with their skills, the professional counterpart was born. Initially, the contests were similar to amateur matches, except there were no time limits, and submission and choke holds were allowed. Amateur wrestling coexisted peacefully alongside its professional counterpart until around the 1940s before the sport grew more theatrical. Wrestlers from the period were known as hookers or shooters due to their legitimate skills - a dwindling number have remained in the business until modern times. Popular wrestlers from this era include Martin "Farmer" Burns, Frank Gotch, Tom Jenkins, Charles Cutler, Joe Stecher, Earl Caddock, Stanislaus Zbyszko, Ed "Strangler" Lewis, Ad Santel, John Pesek, Jim Londos, Ray Steele, Richard Shikat, and transitional figure Lou Thesz.

Sports entertainment

Sometimes referred as "American-Style" professional wrestling, companies such as WWE, AEW, Impact Wrestling and ROH run touring professional wrestling events throughout the world.  Matches are highly theatrical, with dramatic stories such as feuds between the athletes developed and performed as part of build-up and promotion for matches. Before its increase in popularity in the mid 1980s, professional wrestling in the United States was organised as a cartel of regional monopolies, known as "territories."  Wrestling in some of these areas (particularly the Southern and Midwestern United States) was performed in a relatively less theatrical more serious style, which could vary from realistically sporting to darkly violent, depending on local preference.

British/European wrestling

A different style of professional wrestling evolved in the United Kingdom and spread across Western Europe (where it was known as "Catch" in the non English speaking countries of mainland Europe). Traditionally in this style, there was less use of storylines and angles to promote the matches which, for the most part, had the atmosphere of real wrestling competition. In many countries such as the UK, this form of professional wrestling achieved mainstream popularity with television making household names of its stars, but later declined and was supplanted both on television and in wider culture by imported American wrestling. Some promoters in the UK (and to a lesser extent France and Germany) still produce live shows in this style but face stiff competition from more American-styled rivals.

Puroresu

Japanese professional wrestling, also known as puroresu, is also treated more as a sport than the entertainment style of wrestling common in North America. As with British/European wrestling, there are fewer and less contrived storylines and angles and there is a similar atmosphere of realistic sporting competition. Popular Japanese wrestlers include Rikidozan, Giant Baba, Antonio Inoki, Mitsuharu Misawa, Kenta Kobashi, Shinya Hashimoto and Keiji Mutoh. Shoot style wrestling evolved from traditional puroresu in an attempt to create a combat-based style. Shoot style featured a mix of amateur and catch wrestling, kickboxing and submission grappling. Shoot style wrestling is retrospectively considered a precursor to mixed martial arts.

Lucha libre

Mexican professional wrestling, also known as lucha libre, is a style of wrestling using special holds. Most performers, known as luchadores (singular luchador), begin their careers wearing masks, but most will lose their masks during their careers. Traditionally a match involves the best of three rounds, with no time limit. Each luchador uses his own special wrestling style or "estilo de lucha" consisting of aerial attack moves, strikes and complex submission holds. Popular luchadores in Mexico and Puerto Rico are El Santo, Blue Demon, Mil Máscaras, Perro Aguayo, Carlos Colón, Konnan, L. A. Park and Místico. Several wrestlers who performed in Mexico also had success in the United States, including Eddie Guerrero, Rey Mysterio (Jr.), and Dos Caras Jr./Alberto Del Rio.

Circus wrestling

In France in the 19th century, early professional wrestling shows in the Greco-Roman style were often performed at the circus by the resident strongmen.  This style later spread to circuses in Eastern Europe, particularly in Russia where it was a staple part of circuses in the Soviet era, where it was often advertised as "French wrestling." Ivan Poddubny achieved major stardom in his homeland and beyond during the interwar period.

Judo

Judo is a style of wrestling which is derived from Jujitsu,  a Japanese martial art. As a wrestling style Judo is distinctive in that its practitioners (judokas) wear trousers and a thick jacket and belt (judogi). These suits can be grabbed in order to throw or pin an opponent etc. Judo also allows locks and chokes although these may be restricted or banned outright for juniors. Judo is a popular sport in Japan. Judo clubs (dojos) are also the most common wrestling type clubs in Western Europe and are often found in towns and cities.

Sambo

Sambo is a martial art that originated in the Soviet Union (specifically Russia) in the 20th century. It is an acronym for "self-defence without weapons" in Russian and had its origins in the Soviet armed forces. Its influences are varied, with techniques borrowed from sports ranging from the two international wrestling styles of Greco-Roman and freestyle to judo, jujitsu, European styles of folk wrestling, and even fencing. The rules for sport sambo are similar to those in competitive judo, with a variety of leg locks and defense holds from the various national wrestling styles in the Soviet Union, while not allowing chokeholds.

Mixed martial arts

The rapid rise in the popularity of mixed martial arts (MMA) has increased interest in wrestling due to its effectiveness in the sport. It is considered one of five core disciplines in MMA together with muay Thai, kickboxing, judo and Brazilian jiu-jitsu.
Already in the early stages of MMA development, wrestling gained respect due to its effectiveness against traditional martial artists.
Wrestlers, Dan Severn, Don Frye, Mark Coleman, Randy Couture and Mark Kerr went on to win early Ultimate Fighting Tournaments. Ken Shamrock won the first UFC Superfight Championship in the UFC and was also the first King of Pancrase in Japan.

UFC color commentator Joe Rogan stated: “I personally think that the very best skill for MMA is wrestling, I think that's the number one base to come from because those guys just flat out dictate where the fight takes place [standing or on the ground]." "There is no better base for entering into mixed martial arts than the highly successful competitor as a wrestler. The competitive wrestlers, the highly successful amateur wrestlers have such tremendous mental toughness. If you can just get through the room, the wrestling room practices at like really high level universities, NCAA division one teams; those guys are savages. The stuff they go through, just the overtraining, just the mental toughness that you have to develop."

Successful MMA fighters who began their training in various forms of wrestling include former UFC Lightweight Champion Frankie Edgar, 2000 Olympic silver medalist Yoel Romero, UFC Light Heavyweight Champion Jon Jones who was a New York wrestling state champion and JUCO national wrestling champion, former Olympic wrestler and former UFC Light Heavyweight and Heavyweight Champion Daniel Cormier, 2008 Olympic Gold medalist and former UFC Flyweight Champion and Bantamweight Champion Henry Cejudo, and former UFC Welterweight Champion Johny Hendricks who was a two-time NCAA wrestling champion.

See also
 Amateur wrestling
 List of famous amateur wrestlers
 List of World and Olympic Champions in men's freestyle wrestling
 List of World and Olympic Champions in women's freestyle wrestling
 List of World and Olympic Champions in Greco-Roman wrestling
 Aquathlon (underwater wrestling)
 Arm wrestling
 Catch wrestling
 Indian wrestling
 Grappling
 Malla-yuddha
 Mixed martial arts
 Pankration
 Professional wrestling
 List of professional wrestlers
 WrestleMania
 Skin infections and wrestling
 Sumo
 United World Wrestling (UWW)
 Wrestling at the Summer Olympics
 Wrestling in Canada

References

Notes

External links

 FILA Wrestling

 
Ancient Olympic Games
Mixed martial arts styles
Summer Olympic sports